Dielectric complex reluctance is a scalar measurement of a passive dielectric circuit (or element within that circuit) dependent on sinusoidal voltage and sinusoidal electric induction flux, and this is determined by deriving the ratio of their complex effective amplitudes.

   

As seen above, dielectric complex reluctance is a phasor represented as uppercase Z epsilon where:
  and  represent the voltage (complex effective amplitude)
  and  represent the electric induction flux (complex effective amplitude)
 , lowercase z epsilon, is the real part of dielectric reluctance

The "lossless" dielectric reluctance, lowercase z epsilon, is equal to the absolute value (modulus) of the dielectric complex reluctance. The argument distinguishing the "lossy" dielectric complex reluctance from the "lossless" dielectric reluctance is equal to the natural number  raised to a power equal to:

 

Where:
 is the imaginary unit
 is the phase of voltage
 is the phase of electric induction flux
 is the phase difference

The "lossy" dielectric complex reluctance represents a dielectric circuit element's resistance to not only electric induction flux but also to changes in electric induction flux.  When applied to harmonic regimes, this formality is similar to Ohm's Law in ideal AC circuits. In dielectric circuits, a dielectric material has a dielectric complex reluctance equal to:

Where:
 is the length of the circuit element
 is the cross-section of the circuit element
 is the complex dielectric permeability

See also
Dielectric
Dielectric reluctance — Special definition of dielectric reluctance that does not account for energy loss

References
 Hippel A. R. Dielectrics and Waves. – N.Y.: JOHN WILEY, 1954.
 Popov V. P.  The Principles of Theory of Circuits. – M.: Higher School, 1985, 496 p. (In Russian).
 Küpfmüller K. Einführung in die theoretische Elektrotechnik, Springer-Verlag, 1959.

Electric and magnetic fields in matter